Martin Seanan Clucas is a Northern Irish footballer who plays as a midfielder for NIFL Premiership side Glentoran.

Career

Preston North End
On 9 August 2011, he made his debut for Preston North End in a 3–2 victory over Crewe Alexandra in the League Cup first round. He was subbed off for Barry Nicholson after 66 minutes.

Burton Albion
On 22 March 2012 Clucas signed on loan for Burton Albion until the end of the 2011–12 season. In May 2012, Clucas was released from the club after being told his contract would not be renewed.

Bristol Rovers
On 5 July 2012, Clucas signed a one-year deal with League Two side Bristol Rovers. He made his debut on 14 August 2012 in a 3–1 loss to Ipswich Town. Following Bristol Rovers' relegation from the Football League, Clucas was released at the end of the 2013-14 League Two season.

Linfield
On 14 August 2014, Clucas signed for NIFL Premiership club Linfield in his native Northern Ireland.

Dungannon
In June 2016,Clucas returned home to sign for his hometown club Dungannon Swifts following a brief spell in Australia.

Career statistics

References

External links
Seanan Clucas profile at pnefc.net

Preston North End F.C. players
1992 births
Living people
People from Dungannon
English Football League players
Association footballers from Northern Ireland
Burton Albion F.C. players
Association football midfielders
Bristol Rovers F.C. players
Linfield F.C. players
NIFL Premiership players
Derry City F.C. players
League of Ireland players
Northern Ireland youth international footballers
Northern Ireland under-21 international footballers
Dungannon Swifts F.C. players
Glentoran F.C. players